Pavel Ricka (born 28 January 1987) is a professional Czech football player who currently plays for FK Viktoria Žižkov.

References

External links
 
 Guardian Football

Czech footballers
1987 births
Living people
Czech First League players
FC Baník Ostrava players
FK Čáslav players
1. FK Příbram players
FK Viktoria Žižkov players

Association football defenders